Joseph Ngolepus (born 10 April 1975) is a Kenyan former marathon runner who won the 2001 Berlin Marathon, and finished third at the 2003 London Marathon. He also won the 2003 CPC Loop Den Haag half marathon, the 2004 Rock 'n' Roll San Diego Marathon, the 2006 Madrid Marathon, and the 2008  half marathon.

Personal life
Ngolepus comes from the same region of Kenya as Tegla Loroupe. He has four children.

Career
Ngolepus started training in 1997 alongside Tegla Loroupe. He ran his first marathon in 1999, in a time of 2:16. In 2000, he came fourth at the Rotterdam Marathon in a time of 2:08:49.

Ngolepus entered the 2001 Berlin Marathon as a pacemaker for fellow Kenyans Willy Cheruiyot Kipkirui and William Kiplagat. After  of the race, he decided to try and race for the victory instead. He eventually won, with Cheruiyot second. His finishing time was 2:08:47.

In 2003, Ngolepus won the CPC Loop Den Haag half marathon in a time of 1:00:56. The top six finishers in the race were Kenyan. Later in the year, he came third at the London Marathon, losing in a sprint by one second to Ethiopian Gezahegne Abera and Italy's Stefano Baldini. The top six finished within seven seconds of each other, making it the closest finish in London Marathon history. In 2004, he won the Rock 'n' Roll San Diego Marathon. The conditions were humid and windy, and Ngolepus' winning time of 2:11:04 was the slowest ever winning time at the event, and his split time for the last mile was 5:44. In 2005, Ngolepus came second at the Berlin Half Marathon behind fellow Kenyan Paul Kimugul.

In 2006, Ngolepus won the Madrid Marathon in a course record time of 2:11:30. The previous course record was 2:12:19, set by Tanzanian John Burra 15 years previously. In 2008, Ngolepus fled Kenya during the 2007–2008 Kenyan crisis, in order to compete at the Los Angeles Marathon. Later in the year, he won the  half marathon race, in 1:01:24. In 2011, he was a pacemaker at the Vienna City Marathon, and dropped out of the race after . The race was won by Kenyan John Kiprotich.

Marathons
According to the Association of Road Racing Statisticians, Ngolepus has competed in 31 marathons.

References

External links
 

1975 births
Living people
Kenyan male marathon runners
Kenyan male long-distance runners
Berlin Marathon male winners
People from Nyeri County